Yevgeny Sennikov (born 6 November 1974) is a Russian freestyle skier. He competed in the men's moguls event at the 1998 Winter Olympics.

References

1974 births
Living people
Russian male freestyle skiers
Olympic freestyle skiers of Russia
Freestyle skiers at the 1998 Winter Olympics
Sportspeople from Tomsk